CV, Cv, or cv may refer to:
Curriculum vitae, a summary of academic and professional history and achievements

CV, Cv, or cv may also refer to:

Arts, entertainment, and media
 CV (novel), a novel by Damon Knight
 Character voice, or CV; see voice acting in Japan
 CV Network, a defunct Spanish-language television network in the United States
 Producciones Cinevisión, formerly CV-TV, a Colombian

Businesses and organisations
 Cargolux (IATA designator CV)
 Cartellverband der katholischen deutschen Studentenverbindungen, a German umbrella organisation of Catholic student fraternities
 Central Vermont Railway, a railway that operated in the New England states
 Christian Voice (UK)
 Comando Vermelho, a Brazilian criminal organization
 Conversio Virium, an education group of Columbia University

Places
 .cv, the Internet country code top-level domain (ccTLD) for Cape Verde
 Cee Vee, Texas, an unincorporated community in the United States
 CV postcode area, in the United Kingdom

Science, technology, and mathematics

Electronics and computing
 Capacitance voltage profiling, a technique to characterize semiconductor materials and devices
 Computer vision, methods of extracting information and meaning from images and video
 Constant voltage source, electrical description
 CV/Gate, a control voltage and gate solution

Medicine 
 Contractile vacuole, an organelle found in some cells
 Coronavirus, a type of virus, notably:
Severe acute respiratory syndrome coronavirus 2, the virus causing the 2019–2020 outbreak
Coronavirus disease 2019 (COVID-19), the disease caused by the virus
COVID-19 pandemic, the ongoing pandemic
 Conduction velocity, the speed at which an electrochemical impulse propagates down a neural pathway

Other uses in science, technology, and mathematics
 Cv, the flow coefficient, used to determine the pressure-drop across an element in fluid flow applications
 cv, the specific heat of a material at constant volume
 Calorific value, the amount of heat released during the combustion of a substance
 Cataclysmic variable star, characterized by irregular and large increases in brightness
 Coefficient of variation, a measure of dispersion of a probability distribution
 Compensating variation, an economic concept of compensation for a price change
 Constant-velocity joint, or CV-joint
 Control volume, a presumed volume for analysing the thermodynamic state of a system
 Consonantvowel, an open-syllable pattern in linguistics
 Cultivated variety or cultivar, once commonly abbreviated cv., now officially deprecated but widely used and recommended
 Cyclic voltammetry, an electrochemical way of measuring
 Chemical formula of vanadium carbide

Other uses
 CV (tax horsepower), a French and Italian system of car taxation
 CV, the Hull classification symbol for aircraft carriers in the U.S. Navy
 105 (number), Roman numerals representation of CV
 Chuvash language, a Turkic language of Russia (ISO 639-1 code CV)
 Cross of Valour (disambiguation), various decorations

See also
 C5 (disambiguation), including a list of topics named C.V., etc.